The  is a stable of sumo wrestlers, part of the Tokitsukaze ichimon or group of stables. It was established in 1974 by former maegashira Hoshikabuto, who branched off from Izutsu stable. Former ōzeki Kirishima became the current head coach in December 1997. It absorbed Tatsutagawa stable in November 2000 upon the retirement of the stablemaster there. It lost four top members in April 2011 (Hakuba, Toyozakura, Jūmonji and Kirinowaka), who were forced to retire after being found guilty of match-fixing. The retirement of Ryūhō in 2012 left it with no sekitori until Kiribayama reached the jūryō division in 2019. Kiribayama reached the top makuuchi division in January 2020, the first for the stable since Hakuba in 2008.

After the death of Izutsu-oyakata in September 2019, all personnel from Izutsu stable moved to Michinoku on 1 October 2019. This expanded the stable to 15 wrestlers, the most senior of whom was yokozuna Kakuryū, who retired in March 2021. As of January 2023, it had 12 wrestlers.

Ring name conventions
In the past wrestlers at this stable took ring names or shikona that began with the character 星 (read: hoshi), meaning star, in deference to two of their former owners, but many now use 霧 (read: kiri), meaning fog or mist, after the current owner Kirishima, such as Kiribayama, Kirinoryū and Kirinofuji.

Owners
1997–present: 9th Michinoku Kazuhiro (yakuin taigu iin, former ōzeki Kirishima)
1991-1997: 8th Michinoku Yuji (former maegashira Hoshiiwato)
1974-1991: 7th Michinoku Yoshio (former maegashira Hoshikabuto)

Notable active wrestlers

Kiribayama (best rank komusubi)

Coaches
Kakuryū Rikisaburō (iin, the 71st yokozuna Kakuryū)
Tatsutayama Hironori (iin, former maegashira Sasshūnada)
Urakaze Tomimichi (iin, former maegashira Shikishima)

Assistant
Fukunosato (wakaimonogashira, former jūryō, real name Kunio Fukuda)

Notable former members
 Kakuryū (the 71st yokozuna)
Hoshitango (former jūryō)
Ryūhō (former maegashira)

Usher
Shin (Makushita yobidashi, real name Shinnosuke Yamaki)

Hairdresser
Tokotsuru (Special class tokoyama)
Tokodai (First class tokoyama)

Location and access
Tokyo, Sumida Ward, Ryōgoku 1-18-7
1 minute walk from Ryōgoku Station on Sōbu Line

See also
List of sumo stables
List of active sumo wrestlers
List of past sumo wrestlers
Glossary of sumo terms

References

External links
Official site 
Japan Sumo Association profile

Active sumo stables